Botanical gardens in Netherlands have collections consisting entirely of Netherlands native and endemic species; most have a collection that include plants from around the world. There are botanical gardens and arboreta in all states and territories of Netherlands, most are administered by local governments, some are privately owned.

 Arboretum Trompenburg, Rotterdam
 Botanical and Experimental Garden of the Radboud University of Nijmegen
 Botanische Tuinen Utrecht, Utrecht
 Botanische Tuin TU Delft, Technische Universiteit Delft
 Hortus Botanicus Amsterdam
 Hortus Botanicus VU Amsterdam, Vrije Universiteit, Amsterdam
 Hortus Botanicus Leiden
 Hortus Haren, Haren
 Pinetum Blijdenstein, Hilversum
 Von Gimborn Arboretum, Doorn

References 

Netherlands
Botanical gardens